Yevgeni Makarovich Babich (7 January 1921 – 11 June 1972) was an ice hockey player who played in the Soviet Hockey League.

Biography 
Babich played for HC CSKA Moscow. He was inducted into the Russian and Soviet Hockey Hall of Fame in 1953.

He committed suicide by hanging at his home in 1972.

References

External links 

 Russian and Soviet Hockey Hall of Fame bio

1921 births
1972 suicides
Communist Party of the Soviet Union members
HC CSKA Moscow players
Ice hockey players at the 1956 Winter Olympics
Honoured Masters of Sport of the USSR
Recipients of the Order of the Red Banner of Labour
Recipients of the Order of the Red Star
Medalists at the 1956 Winter Olympics
Olympic gold medalists for the Soviet Union
Olympic ice hockey players of the Soviet Union
Olympic medalists in ice hockey
Soviet bandy players
Soviet ice hockey right wingers
Ice hockey people from Moscow
Suicides by hanging in the Soviet Union
Suicides in Moscow